The Francolí is a river in Catalonia (northeastern Spain). Its source is in the Prades Mountains and it flows into the Mediterranean Sea at Tarragona.

This river has a highly irregular flow. It can cause seasonal floods some of which, like the 1917 one, have caused widespread destruction in Tarragona. Its ancient Roman name was Tulcis.

See also 
 List of rivers of Spain

References

Rivers of Spain
Rivers of Catalonia